Luzerne County is a county in the Commonwealth of Pennsylvania. It is Northeastern Pennsylvania's second-largest county by total area. As of the 2020 census, the population was 325,594, making it the most populous county in the northeastern part of the state. The county seat and largest city is Wilkes-Barre. Other populous communities include Hazleton, Kingston, Nanticoke, and Pittston. Luzerne County is included in the Scranton–Wilkes-Barre–Hazleton Metropolitan Statistical Area, which has a total population of 555,426 as of 2017.

On September 25, 1786, Luzerne County was formed from part of Northumberland County. It was named after Chevalier de la Luzerne, a French soldier and diplomat during the 18th century. When it was founded, Luzerne County occupied a large portion of Northeastern Pennsylvania. From 1810 to 1878, it was divided into several smaller counties. The counties of Bradford, Lackawanna, Susquehanna, and Wyoming were all formed from parts of Luzerne County.

The county gained prominence in the 19th and 20th centuries as an active anthracite coal mining region, drawing a large portion of its labor force from European immigrants. At its peak (in 1930), the county's population was 445,109. Many factories and coal mines closed by the early 21st century. Like most regions in the Rust Belt, Luzerne County witnessed population loss and urban decay. However, in recent years, the economy has grown moderately; warehousing has replaced manufacturing as the main industry.

History
The Luzerne County Historical Society maintains the storehouse for the collective memory of Luzerne County and its environs. It records and interprets the history, traditions, events, people, and cultures that have directed and molded life within the region.
Luzerne county is home to the defending Piaa district 2 boys 5a champs for basketball and defending softball state champs the Pittston Area Patriots

18th Century

Long an area occupied by indigenous peoples, by the 1700s the Wyoming Valley was inhabited by several Native American tribes including the Susquehannock, who spoke an Iroquoian language, and the Delaware, who spoke an Algonquian language. In the mid-18th century, Connecticut settlers of primarily English ancestry ventured into the valley. These were the first recorded Europeans in the region. Some came to conduct missionary work with the Native Americans, while others came to farm the fertile land near the Susquehanna River. Ultimately, the violence of the French and Indian War (the North American front of the Seven Years' War between Great Britain and France) drove these Connecticut settlers away.

The British colonies of Pennsylvania and Connecticut both claimed the Wyoming Valley as their own. King Charles II of England had granted the land to the Connecticut Colony in 1662, but also to William Penn (the founder of Pennsylvania) in 1681. In 1769, Yankee settlers from Connecticut returned to the valley and founded the town of Wilkes-Barre. However, they were not alone. Pennsylvanian settlers (Pennamites) were also in the region. Armed bands of Pennamites harassed the Connecticut settlers in what is known as the Pennamite-Yankee Wars. While the land dispute continued, a much larger conflict began. In 1775, the Thirteen Colonies began a war of independence against Great Britain (the mother country). Residents of both Pennsylvania and Connecticut were largely loyal to the cause of American independence.

On June 30, 1778, Loyalist forces, under the command of Major John Butler, arrived in the Wyoming Valley to attack the American settlements. On July 1, Fort Wintermoot at the north end of the valley surrendered without a shot being fired. The next morning the smaller Fort Jenkins surrendered. Both forts were later burned to the ground.

Meanwhile the Patriot militia assembled at Forty Fort. On July 3, a column of roughly 375 men including a company of soldiers in the Continental Army marched from the fort under the command of Lieutenant Colonel Zebulon Butler and Colonel Nathan Denison. Butler's Rangers, with the assistance of about 500 Native American allies, mostly Seneca, ambushed the oncoming Americans. In the end, nearly 300 Wyoming Valley Patriots were killed in what is commonly known as the Wyoming Massacre. Today, in the Borough of Wyoming, a monument marks the gravesite of the victims from the battle.

The next day Colonel Denison surrendered Forty Fort along with several other posts. Widespread looting and burning of buildings occurred throughout the Wyoming Valley subsequent to the capitulation, but non-combatants were not harmed. Most of the inhabitants, however, fled across the Pocono Mountains to Stroudsburg and Easton or down the Susquehanna River to Sunbury.

In September 1778, partial revenge for the Wyoming defeat was taken by American Colonel Thomas Hartley. He and his 200 soldiers burned a number of Delaware villages along the Susquehanna River. The following year, Major General John Sullivan would lead several thousand men in a scorched-earth campaign against the Iroquois.

Two years later, in September 1780, reports of Iroquois and Loyalist activity in the region resulted in a detachment of 41 Patriot militia (from Northampton County) being sent to investigate. The detachment made it as far north as present-day Conyngham when they were ambushed by a party of Seneca and Loyalists. Ten men were killed in what is now known as the Sugarloaf Massacre.

Post-Revolutionary War
The American Revolutionary War ended three years later (in 1783) with the signing of the Treaty of Paris. With the signing of the treaty, Great Britain finally recognized the sovereignty of the United States of America. The land dispute between Pennsylvania and Connecticut continued after the war. Connecticut established its own county (by the name of Westmoreland) in the Wyoming Valley. However, Pennsylvania insisted that they owned the land. The Congress of the Confederation was asked to resolve the matter. With the Trenton Decree, on December 30, 1782, the confederation government officially decided that the region belonged to Pennsylvania; the Wyoming Valley became part of Northumberland County.

Pennsylvania ruled that the Connecticut settlers (Yankees) were not citizens of the Commonwealth. Therefore, they could not vote and were ordered to give up their property claims. In May 1784, armed men from Pennsylvania force-marched the Connecticut settlers away from the valley. By November, the Yankees returned with a greater force. They captured and destroyed Fort Dickinson in Wilkes-Barre. With that victory, a new state (which was separate from both Connecticut and Pennsylvania) was proposed. The new state was to be named Westmoreland. To ensure that they didn't lose the land, the Commonwealth of Pennsylvania worked out a compromise with the Connecticut (Yankee) settlers. The Yankee settlers would be allowed to become citizens of Pennsylvania and their property claims would be restored (prior to the Decree of Trenton). As part of the compromise, Pennsylvania would establish a new county in Northeastern Pennsylvania. The Yankees agreed to the terms.

On September 25, 1786, the Pennsylvania General Assembly passed a resolution which created Luzerne County. It was formed from a section of Northumberland County and named after Chevalier de la Luzerne, a French soldier and diplomat to the American rebels and new government of the independent United States of America during the late 18th century. Wilkes-Barre was designated as the seat of government for the new territory. This resolution ended the idea of creating a new state. When it was founded, Luzerne County occupied a large portion of Northeastern Pennsylvania. The future counties of Bradford, Lackawanna, Susquehanna, and Wyoming were all part of the original Luzerne County.

In the following years, elections were held, the courts were established, a courthouse was constructed, and a government was formed. In 1787, Lord Butler was elected the first sheriff of Luzerne County. A board of commissioners was also assembled to manage the county government. Some of the first county commissioners included Jesse Fell, Alexander Johnson, John Phillips, John Jenkins, and Thomas Wright (from 1794 to 1796). The population of the new county grew rapidly. In 1790, fewer than 2,000 people resided within the Wyoming Valley. By 1800, the number of residents increased to nearly 13,000.

Post-Revolutionary War
The American Revolutionary War ended three years later (in 1783) with the signing of the Treaty of Paris. With the signing of the treaty, Great Britain finally recognized the sovereignty of the United States of America. The land dispute between Pennsylvania and Connecticut continued after the war. Connecticut established its own county (by the name of Westmoreland) in the Wyoming Valley. However, Pennsylvania insisted that they owned the land. The Congress of the Confederation was asked to resolve the matter. With the Decree of Trenton, on December 30, 1782, the confederation government officially decided that the region belonged to Pennsylvania; the Wyoming Valley became part of Northumberland County.

Pennsylvania ruled that the Connecticut settlers (Yankees) were not citizens of the Commonwealth. Therefore, they could not vote and were ordered to give up their property claims. In May 1784, armed men from Pennsylvania force-marched the Connecticut settlers away from the valley. By November, the Yankees returned with a greater force. They captured and destroyed Fort Dickinson in Wilkes-Barre. With that victory, a new state (which was separate from both Connecticut and Pennsylvania) was proposed. The new state was to be named Westmoreland. To ensure that they didn't lose the land, the Commonwealth of Pennsylvania worked out a compromise with the Connecticut (Yankee) settlers. The Yankee settlers would be allowed to become citizens of Pennsylvania and their property claims would be restored (prior to the Decree of Trenton). As part of the compromise, Pennsylvania would establish a new county in Northeastern Pennsylvania. The Yankees agreed to the terms.

On September 25, 1786, the Pennsylvania General Assembly passed a resolution which created Luzerne County. It was formed from a section of Northumberland County and named after Chevalier de la Luzerne, a French soldier and diplomat to the American rebels and new government of the independent United States of America during the late 18th century. Wilkes-Barre was designated as the seat of government for the new territory. This resolution ended the idea of creating a new state. When it was founded, Luzerne County occupied a large portion of Northeastern Pennsylvania. The future counties of Bradford, Lackawanna, Susquehanna, and Wyoming were all part of the original Luzerne County.

In the following years, elections were held, the courts were established, a courthouse was constructed, and a government was formed. In 1787, Lord Butler was elected the first sheriff of Luzerne County. A board of commissioners was also assembled to manage the county government. Some of the first county commissioners included Jesse Fell, Alexander Johnson, John Phillips, John Jenkins, and Thomas Wright (from 1794 to 1796). The population of the new county grew rapidly. In 1790, fewer than 2,000 people resided within the Wyoming Valley. By 1800, the number of residents increased to nearly 13,000.

19th century

The county gained prominence in the 19th century as an active anthracite coal mining region. In 1791, German immigrant Philip Ginder stumbled across anthracite (or "hard coal") near Summit Hill. This resulted in the creation of the Lehigh Coal Mine Company. The company had a slow start because of the difficulty in igniting anthracite coal and the inability to transfer it to urban markets. In 1807, Brothers Abijah and John Smith were the first to successfully transport anthracite down the Susquehanna River on an ark. In 1808, Judge Jesse Fell of Wilkes-Barre discovered a solution to ignite anthracite with the usage of an iron grate; it allowed for the coal to light and burn easier. This invention increased the popularity of anthracite as a fuel source. This led to the expansion of the coal industry in Northeastern Pennsylvania. Throughout the 1800s, canals and railroads were constructed to aid in the mining and transportation of coal.

As the mining industry grew, a large region north of the Wyoming Valley – close to the New York border — sought independence from Luzerne County. On February 21, 1810, the counties of Bradford — originally called Ontario – and Susquehanna were created from parts of Luzerne County. The two counties were officially formed in 1812. Thirty years later, on April 4, 1842, Wyoming County — the region in and around present-day Tunkhannock — was also formed from a section of Luzerne County.

The County of Luzerne witnessed a population boom as a result of the growing coal mining industry. Carbondale, with a population of nearly 5,000 residents, was incorporated as a city on March 15, 1851. Scranton, with a population of nearly 35,000, was incorporated as a city on April 23, 1866. And Wilkes-Barre, with a population of just over 10,000, was incorporated as a city in 1871. By 1875, anthracite coal from Luzerne County alone represented half the anthracite produced in the Commonwealth of Pennsylvania.

Since 1839, the people in and around the cities of Scranton and Carbondale sought independence from Luzerne County. Wilkes-Barre was determined to preserve the integrity of the county; it did not want to lose its assets in the region. Decades later, in the 1870s, residents of the proposed territory were allowed to vote for independent status. Voters favored a new county by a proportion of 6 to 1, with Scranton residents providing considerable support. Lackawanna County was finally created from a portion of Luzerne County in 1878.

Even through Luzerne County lost a vital region (the coal mining cities of Scranton and Carbondale), its boroughs and townships continued to grow. Hazleton (in 1891) and Pittston (in 1894) were both incorporated as cities due to their expanding populations. Thousands of European immigrants poured into Luzerne County due to the booming coal industry. The growing population quickly attracted the attention of factory owners in New York City and Philadelphia. Dozens of factories throughout Luzerne County were established to take advantage of the ever-increasing pool of available labor.

With an increasing population and the build-up of industry in the region, tragedies became more frequent in the second half of the 19th century. Sixteen people were killed – largely in factories – when a devastating F3 tornado struck Wilkes-Barre on August 19, 1890. It was the deadliest tornado in the county's history. The region's first significant mining disaster occurred on September 6, 1869, when a massive fire at the Avondale Colliery in Plymouth Township killed 110 people. Another consequential mining accident occurred on June 28, 1896, when the Newton Coal Company's Twin Shaft Mine in Pittston City caved-in and killed 58 miners.

Towards the end of the 19th century, labor unrest and union activity intensified in the region. Miners protested poor working conditions and unfair pay. This revved up tensions throughout the county. One of the most notable and deadly confrontations occurred on September 10, 1897 (near Hazleton). Luzerne County Sheriff James Martin formed a posse and fired on a group of unarmed striking miners in what is now known as the Lattimer massacre. Roughly nineteen people were killed and dozens more were wounded. Luzerne is infamous for being the last county whose sheriff legally formed a posse to restore order in a time of civil unrest.

20th century

At the beginning of the 20th century, Luzerne County was in the midst of an economic boom. Industry, which included manufacturing and coal mining, drew thousands of immigrants (mostly from Europe) to the region. However, there were several drawbacks to the industrial boom. Labor unrest, mining accidents, and child labor were just a few problems facing the county. Labor disputes led to miners striking in the late 1800s and early 1900s. The Great Strike of 1902 gained national attention when it threatened to shut down the winter fuel supply for major U.S. cities. At that time, residences were typically heated with anthracite (or "hard coal"). The United Mine Workers of America protested for higher wages, shorter workdays, and the recognition of their union. President Theodore Roosevelt became involved and set up a fact-finding commission that suspended the strike. The strike never resumed, as the miners received a ten percent wage increase and reduced workdays (from ten to nine hours). It was the first labor dispute in which the U.S. federal government intervened as a neutral arbitrator.

Also, in the early 1900s, the anthracite coal mining industry – and its extensive use of child labor – was one of the industries targeted by the National Child Labor Committee and its hired photographer, Lewis Hine. Many of Hine's subjects were photographed in the mines and coal fields in and around Pittston and Wilkes-Barre. The impact of the Hine photographs led to the enactment of child labor laws across the country.

Despite the better working conditions, industrial accidents were still commonplace. On December 6, 1915, an underground mine fire started in the Red Ash Coal Mine near the communities of Laurel Run and Georgetown. Hundreds of residents living near the mine fire were later relocated. The fire continued to burn well into the 21st century. On June 5, 1919, another major mining accident occurred nearby. An explosion killed 92 miners at the Baltimore Colliery in Wilkes-Barre.

Regardless of the industrial setbacks, the region continued to grow economically. In 1906, construction began on a new county courthouse in Wilkes-Barre. Twenty years later (in 1926), Nanticoke, with a population of just over 22,000, was incorporated as a city. It was the last city established in the county. By 1930, the county's population peaked at 445,109. It was obvious that industry was the driving force behind the expanding population. From the 1930s to the 1980s, Pittston City emerged as a national center for clothing manufacturing. Thousands of workers, mainly women, labored in many factories throughout the Greater Pittston area. Most were members of the International Ladies' Garment Workers' Union (ILGWU). It advocated for higher wages, improvements in workplace health and safety, and employee rights. The ILGWU was active in civic and political life throughout Pennsylvania.

Railroad accidents were common throughout the United States in the 1800s and 1900s. In 1934, the right arm of Hughestown resident Harry Tompkins was crushed by an Erie Railroad train. This resulted in the U.S. Supreme Court case Erie Railroad Co. v. Tompkins, which laid the foundation for a large part of modern American civil procedure.

As the United States entered the age of mass air transportation, Scranton and Wilkes-Barre (the largest cities in Northeast Pennsylvania) recognized the need for a large-scale airport. Despite the Great Depression and hard times affecting the local coal mining industry, a windfall multimillion-dollar opportunity to plan and build a regional airport was presented to the counties of Luzerne and Lackawanna through the federal government's Public Works Administration. It became apparent that a modern airport would be needed for the economic survival of the region. The site in and around Pittston Township was first surveyed in 1939 by the county commissioners of both counties.

In 1941, John B. McDade, president of the Heidelberg Coal Company and father of Congressman Joseph M. McDade, donated 122 acres on which part of the airport now sits. Most of the land was previously owned by various coal companies. By 1945, the two counties entered into a legal agreement to co-sponsor and operate the airport. Between 1945 and 1947, construction of the Wilkes-Barre/Scranton International Airport took place in and around Pittston Township. Today, the airport is known as the "Gateway to Northeastern Pennsylvania and the Pocono Mountains." It is the fifth busiest airport in Pennsylvania.

By the mid-20th century, anthracite production was declining at a steady rate. Consumers were gradually switching from coal to other forms of energy (e.g., oil, natural gas, and electricity). The Knox Mine Disaster was the final blow to the industry. On January 22, 1959, the Susquehanna River broke through the River Slope Mine in Port Griffith, Jenkins Township; it claimed the lives of twelve people. In the following months, two of the area's largest coal companies announced a full withdrawal from the anthracite business. Thousands of jobs were lost and the mining industry never recovered in Luzerne County.

The Wyoming Valley witnessed historical flooding from the Susquehanna River in the past. In June 1972, Hurricane Agnes devastated much of the Eastern Seaboard (including Pennsylvania). The Susquehanna River rose to 40.9 feet and breached the levees of several communities in the Wyoming Valley. In Wilkes-Barre, hundreds were trapped in their homes; nearly nine feet of water inundated Public Square. At the historic cemetery in Forty Fort, 2,000 caskets were washed away, leaving body parts on porches, roofs, and in basements. In Luzerne County alone, 25,000 homes and businesses were either damaged or destroyed. Losses in the county totaled $1 billion.

Luzerne County's economy was hit hard with the collapse of the mining industry and the devastating Agnes flood. To make matters worse, factories throughout the county were shutting down. They could not compete with lower labor costs elsewhere. By the end of the 20th century, Luzerne County was in the midst of a recession.

Following the Agnes flood (from the 1980s to 2000), two notable tragedies occurred in Luzerne County. The first took place on September 25, 1982, when George Banks killed thirteen people in a shooting rampage in Wilkes-Barre and Jenkins Township. The second incident took place on May 21, 2000, when a plane crash in Bear Creek Township (near the intersection of Bear Creek Boulevard – PA Route 115 – and the Northeast Extension of the Pennsylvania Turnpike) killed the pilot as well as all nineteen passengers.

21st century

Many factories and coal mines were long since closed by the turn of the 21st century. Like most regions in the Rust Belt, Luzerne County witnessed population loss and urban decay over many decades beginning in the mid-20th century. Luzerne County in particular had reached the apex of its population around 1930. However, despite continuing population loss in recent years, the economy has grown moderately; warehousing has replaced manufacturing as the main industry.

In the late 2000s, several scandals related to public corruption, cronyism, patronage hiring, and wasteful spending affected the county. The "kids for cash" scandal unfolded in 2008 over judicial kickbacks at the Luzerne County Court of Common Pleas in Wilkes-Barre. Two judges, President Judge Mark Ciavarella and Senior Judge Michael Conahan, were convicted of accepting money from Robert Mericle, builder of two private, for-profit youth centers for the detention of juveniles, in return for contracting with the facilities and imposing harsh adjudications on juveniles brought before their courts to increase the number of residents in the centers. In the following years, additional county officials faced criminal charges (e.g., a clerk of courts, a deputy chief clerk, a director of human resources). County Commissioner Greg Skrepenak resigned in 2009; he was ultimately sentenced to prison for accepting money from a developer who received government-backed financing.

In May 2009, voters approved the creation of a government study commission. The commission proposed and wrote a home rule charter for Luzerne County. On November 2, 2010, the voters of Luzerne County held a referendum on the question of home rule. A total of 51,413 (55.25%) voted in favor of home rule, while another 41,639 (44.75%) voted against the move. The home rule charter would eliminate the positions of the three county commissioners; they would be replaced by an eleven-member county council (who will appoint and work alongside a county manager). This referendum "starts a new chapter in Luzerne County history," remarked James Haggerty, the chairman of the commission that wrote and proposed the charter. The first election for the new government was scheduled for 2011 – which ended up becoming an eventful year for Luzerne County.

From March to June of that year, the Borough of Duryea received national attention for its role in the landmark Supreme Court case Borough of Duryea v. Guarnieri, in which the court stated that "a government employer's allegedly retaliatory actions against an employee do not give rise to liability under the Petition Clause unless the employee's petition relates to a matter of public concern."

The second major event occurred in September 2011, when Luzerne County witnessed historical flooding from Tropical Storm Lee. The river topped the  level in flooding caused by Hurricane Agnes in 1972. However, unlike 1972, the levee system in Wilkes-Barre and several other communities held. Those municipalities without a levee system witnessed severe flooding.

The first general election for Luzerne County Council was held on November 8, making it the third and final consequential event of 2011. In the end, six Democrats, four Republicans, and one independent politician were elected.

The home rule charter took effect on January 2, 2012. The Luzerne County Board of Commissioners was abolished and replaced with the new form of government (council–manager government). The last three commissioners were Chairwoman Maryanne Petrilla, Stephen A. Urban, and Thomas Cooney. The first eleven council members were sworn in that same day. According to the charter, the council chair is "recognized as head of the county government for ceremonial purposes." The first council chair was Jim Bobeck. During the first council meeting, Tom Pribula was appointed interim county manager. Several weeks later, the council officially appointed the first permanent manager (Robert Lawton).

During the 2019 county council election, Republicans secured a majority on the county's governing board for the first time since 1989.

Geography

The highest point in the county is Cherry Ridge in Fairmount Township.

Luzerne County consists of 76 independently governing municipalities (which includes 4 cities, 36 boroughs, and 36 townships).

The Wyoming Valley, also referred to as the Anthracite Valley Section of Pennsylvania, runs directly through Luzerne County. It extends from the northeastern border (with Lackawanna County) to the western border (with Columbia County). The county is crossed by a series of east-to-west mountains (e.g., Buck Mountain, Nescopeck Mountain, Penobscot Knob, and Red Rock Mountain). They are all part of the Appalachian Mountain Range.

The Susquehanna River is the largest river in the county. There are several islands located within the river; for example, Scovell Island (near Pittston), Monocanock Island (near Wyoming), and Richard Island (near Wilkes-Barre). The Susquehanna drains most of the county (including Bowman Creek, Huntington Creek, the Lackawanna River, Nescopeck Creek, Solomon Creek, and many other streams). The Lehigh River, which forms part of Luzerne County's southeastern border, drains the easternmost region. Dozens of lakes and ponds are also scattered throughout the county (e.g., Harveys Lake, Lake Jean, Lake Louise, and Long Pond).

Luzerne County consists of several urban areas. The first is a contiguous quilt-work of former anthracite coal mining communities (including the cities of Pittston, Wilkes-Barre, and Nanticoke). It is located in the northeastern and central part of the county (in the Wyoming Valley). The second is Hazleton and it is located in the southern portion of the county. Other urban areas include the Back Mountain (in northern Luzerne County) and Mountain Top (between Wilkes-Barre and Hazleton). Thick forests and small farming communities are located just outside the urban centers.

State parks and forests
 There are four state parks in Luzerne County:
 Frances Slocum State Park (northern Luzerne County)
 Lehigh Gorge State Park (eastern Luzerne County)
 Nescopeck State Park (southern Luzerne County)
 Ricketts Glen State Park (western Luzerne County)
 There is only one state forest in Luzerne County:
 Pinchot State Forest, which includes Moon Lake Park and Seven Tubs Recreation Area
 Other recreational areas:
 Bear Creek Camp Conservation Area
 Lehigh Gorge Trail
 Susquehanna Warrior Trail

Adjacent counties
 Carbon County (southeast)
 Columbia County (west)
 Lackawanna County (northeast)
 Monroe County (east)
 Schuylkill County (south)
 Sullivan County (northwest)
 Wyoming County (north)

Climate

Luzerne County has a humid continental climate (Köppen climate classification Dfa/mostly Dfb) with four distinct seasons. The surrounding mountains have an influence on the climate (which includes both precipitation and temperature). This results in a wide array of weather conditions throughout the county. On average, temperatures below  are infrequent, occurring three days per year, and there are 36 days where the maximum temperature remains below . In the Wilkes-Barre area, the average annual snowfall is  during the winter (in which severe snowstorms are rare). However, when snowstorms do occur, they can disrupt normal routines for several days.

In an average summer, temperatures exceeding  occur on nine days and can occasionally exceed . Spring and fall are unpredictable, with temperatures ranging from cold to warm (although they are usually mild). On average, Wilkes-Barre receives  of precipitation each year, which is relatively evenly distributed throughout the year (though the summer months receive more precipitation).

The hardiness zone in most of the county is 6a and ranges from 5a to 6b. Wilkes-Barre averages 2,303 hours of sunshine per year, ranging from a low of 96 hours in December (or 33% of possible sunshine) to 286 hours in July (or 62% of possible sunshine). Despite being at the south end of the county, Hazleton's temperatures average lower than those of the Wyoming Valley due to its elevation.

Ecology 
Sceptridium dissectum is a common fern in the county.

Demographics

As of the 2020 census, the county was 89.3% White, 6.6% Black or African American, 0.7% Native American, 1.4% Asian, and 2.0% were of two or more races. 13.8% of the population were of Hispanic or Latino ancestry.

According to the 2010 census, the county was 90.7% White, 3.4% Black or African American, 0.2% Native American, 1.0% Asian, 3.3% other race, and 1.5% were of two or more races. 6.7% of the population were of Hispanic or Latino ancestry.

According to the census of 2000, there were 319,250 people, 130,687 households, and 84,293 families residing in the county. The population density was 358 people per square mile (138/km2). There were 144,686 housing units at an average density of 162 per square mile (63/km2). The racial makeup of the county was 96.63% White, 1.69% Black or African American, 0.09% Native American, 0.58% Asian, 0.01% Pacific Islander, 0.43% other race, and 0.57% from two or more races. 1.16% of the population were Hispanic or Latino. 22.2% were of Polish ancestry, 15.6% of Italian ancestry, 13.8% of Irish ancestry, 12.1% of German ancestry, and 5.3% of Slovak ancestry. Luzerne County is the only county in the United States with a plurality of citizens reporting Polish as their primary ancestry; the plurality of Pennsylvanians report German or Pennsylvania Dutch.

There were 130,687 households, out of which 48.80% were married couples living together. 11.50% had a female householder with no husband present. 35.50% were non-families. 31.30% of all households were made up of individuals. 16% of those age 65 years and older lived alone. The average household size was 2.34 and the average family size was 2.95.

In the county, the population consisted of 21% under the age of 18, 8.10% from 18 to 24, 27.20% from 25 to 44, 24% from 45 to 64, and 19.70% who were 65 years of age or older. The median age was 41 years. For every 100 females, there were 93 males. For every 100 females (age 18 and over), there were 89.50 males.

The median household income (in 2015 dollars) was $45,897. 15.1% of the population lives in poverty. 60.4% of those 16 years of age or older are in the civilian labor force. There are more white collar jobs in Luzerne County than blue collar jobs. In total, there are 91,801 white collar jobs and 62,813 blue collar jobs. The mean travel time to work (for those 16 years of age or older) was 22.1 minutes. In terms of education, 88.9% (of those 25 years of age or older) are high school graduates or higher. 21.4% (of those 25 years of age or older) have a bachelor's degree or higher. In terms of healthcare, 10.8% (for those under the age of 65) are living with a disability. As of 2015, 25,317 veterans are living in Luzerne County.

2020 Census

Languages
The two major languages spoken in Luzerne County are English and Spanish. 5.8% of the population speaks Spanish at home.

Religion
59.27% of the people in Luzerne County are religious, meaning they affiliate with a religion. 43.77% are Catholic; 0.28% are LDS (or the Church of Jesus Christ of Latter-day Saints); 0.51% are Baptist; 0.55% are Episcopalian; 1.05% are Pentecostal; 3.11% are Lutheran; 4.40% are Methodist; 1.95% are Presbyterian; 2.33% are of some other Christian faith; 0.78% are Jewish; 0.00% are of an eastern faith; and 0.51% practice Islam.

Economy
Penn State runs the Extensions in the state, including . The office here is in West Pittston.

Grains, seeds, beans, and peas make up about one third of the county's farm revenues. Due to its position as a somewhat less populated area near much larger metropolises, Luzerne's agritourism business is one of the larger in the state.

Through 2019 the Spotted Lanternfly (Lycorma delicatula) was quarantined in neighboring counties, and there was tremendous concern that it would spread here. This was considered to be inevitable. In 2020 the state Ag Department added the county to the SLF quarantine zone. In October a homeowner noticed an adult on his house siding and recognized it from Penn State Extension's education campaign. He reported it and the state began efforts in Luzerne. An economic analysis for the General Assembly shows the effects on the county's economy will be severe.

Luzerne is both a productive farming county and a commuter location for nearby large cities.

Garlic Mustard (Alliaria petiolata) is an invasive weed here, first known from 2001. Kunkel & Chen 2022 find that, contrary to what has been found elsewhere, here it thrives in shaded habitats and is not helped by light exposure.

Government

Background
Luzerne County voters rejected home rule proposals in the past (once in 1974 and again in 2003). However, from 2008 to 2010, corruption plagued the county government. Three county judges, a county commissioner, a clerk of courts, a deputy chief clerk, and a director of human resources faced criminal charges. These events persuaded the voters of Luzerne County to adopt a new form of government. On Tuesday, November 2, 2010, a home rule charter was adopted by a margin of 51,413 to 41,639.

The following year (in 2011), the first election for the new government was held. On Monday, January 2, 2012, the previous government (the board of county commissioners) was abolished and replaced with the new form of government (council–manager government). The first members of the Luzerne County Council were sworn in that same day. The council's highest-ranking officer is the chair; who is also the head of county government for ceremonial purposes. The first council chair was Jim Bobeck. The assembly consists of eleven elected members. They appoint and work alongside a full-time manager. The manager oversees the county's day-to-day operations. The first manager was Robert Lawton.

County Council

Luzerne County Council is the governing body of the county. The council meets at the Luzerne County Courthouse. There are eleven members on the assembly – ten Republicans and one Democrat. Each member is duly elected by the voters of the county. The chair is appointed by their fellow council members. The chair is both the highest-ranking officer on the council and the head of county government for ceremonial purposes. He or she sets the agenda for the council and administers the meetings. When the group is not in session, the officer's duties often include acting as its representative to the outside world and its spokesperson. The current chair is Kendra M. Radle.

County Manager

The executive branch is headed by the Luzerne County Manager. The manager supervises the county's day-to-day operations. According to the home rule charter, the manager "shall serve at the pleasure of county council." In other words, the council has the power to appoint and remove the manager. Each ordinance, resolution, and policy established by county council should be faithfully executed by the county manager. The manager may make recommendations to the council; however, the manager does not have the authority to vote on or veto any legislation originating from the assembly. The current acting manager is Brian Swetz.

Other county officials
 Controller: Walter L. Griffith, Jr.
 Director of Human Resources: Angela Gavlick
 District Attorney: Samuel Sanguedocle
 Chief Public Defender: Steven M. Greenwald
 Sheriff: Brian M. Szumski

Politics

|}

As of January 30, 2023, there are 195,449 registered voters in Luzerne County. 
 Democratic: 88,314 (45.2%)
 Republican: 81,709 (41.8%)
 Independent: 19,346 (9.9%)
 Third Party: 6,080 (3.1%)

The Democratic Party has been historically dominant in county-level politics. However, during the 2019 Luzerne County Council election, Republicans – for the first time – secured a majority on council, the county's governing body. Thomas Baldino, professor emeritus of political science at Wilkes University, suspected that the 2019 Luzerne County Council election results were due to the trending Republican preference in the county (mostly due to then-President Trump's popularity in the region).

During presidential elections, the county is considered a bellwether of the state. Until 2020, it had voted for the presidential candidate who carried Pennsylvania in every election since 1936. Luzerne County has leaned Democratic in past presidential elections; however, that trend has changed in recent years. During the 2000 U.S. presidential election, Democrat Al Gore won 52% of the vote to Republican George W. Bush's 44%. In 2004, it was much closer, with Democrat John Kerry winning 51% to Republican George Bush's 48%. Democrat Barack Obama carried the county twice (once in 2008, and again in 2012). During the 2016 presidential election, the county swung dramatically to Republican Donald Trump, who won it with 58% of the vote, the largest margin since President Richard Nixon in 1972. It was the first time a Republican presidential candidate carried the county since 1988. Trump won the county almost as easily in 2020.

In recent years, Luzerne County has witnessed mixed results in U.S. senate elections. In 2000, 2004, 2016, 2018, and 2022, the Republican candidates for U.S. senate won the county. However, Democratic candidates for U.S. senate carried the county in 2006 (with 60.6% of the vote), 2010, and 2012.

Democratic candidates for Pennsylvania governor won Luzerne County in 2002, 2006 (with 67.5% of the vote), 2014, 2018, and 2022. In recent years, the county voted for a Republican gubernatorial candidate only once (in 2010).

United States Senate
 Bob Casey, D
 John Fetterman, D

United States House of Representatives
 Matthew Cartwright, D, Pennsylvania's 8th congressional district
 Dan Meuser, R, Pennsylvania's 9th congressional district

State Senate
 Lisa Baker, R, Pennsylvania's 20th Senatorial District
 Marty Flynn, D, Pennsylvania's 22nd Senatorial District
 , Pennsylvania's 27th Senatorial District
 Dave Argall, R, Pennsylvania's 29th Senatorial District

State House of Representatives
 Dane Watro, R, Pennsylvania's 116th Representative District
 Mike Cabell, R, Pennsylvania's 117th Representative District
 Jim Haddock, D, Pennsylvania's 118th Representative District
 Alec Ryncavage, R, Pennsylvania's 119th Representative District
 Aaron Kaufer, R, Pennsylvania's 120th Representative District
 Eddie Day Pashinski, D, Pennsylvania's 121st Representative District

Public safety

There are many fire and police departments scattered throughout Luzerne County. Each individual community (city, borough, and township) determines the boundaries of each department. The firefighters provide fire protection for its citizens. Most fire departments are headed by a fire chief and are staffed by a combination of career and volunteer firefighters.

The police provide full-time protection to its citizens, visitors, businesses, and public property. Most departments are headed by a chief of police and operate out of their local municipal building. The Luzerne County Sheriff's Office operates out of Wilkes-Barre's Luzerne County Courthouse. The sheriff is an official who is responsible for keeping the peace and enforcing the law throughout the county.

After Luzerne County adopted a home rule charter, the office of sheriff became an appointed position (and was no longer an elected one). The Pennsylvania State Police also have a presence in the county. Troop P operates out of the northern half of Luzerne County and is headquartered in Hanover Township as PSP Wilkes-Barre. Troop P also has a barracks in Salem Township—PSP Shickshinny. Troop N operates out of the southern portion of the county and is headquartered in West Hazleton as PSP Hazleton.

Healthcare

Hospitals
 First Hospital in Kingston, an affiliate of Commonwealth Health (psychiatric care only)
 Geisinger South Wilkes Barre Hospital (GSWB), formerly Mercy Hospital
 Geisinger Wyoming Valley Medical Center (GWV) in Plains Township
 Hazleton General Hospital (Lehigh Valley Health Network)
 Nanticoke Special Care Hospital, an affiliate of Commonwealth Health
 VA Medical Center in Wilkes-Barre
 Wilkes-Barre General Hospital, an affiliate of Commonwealth Health

Education

Public school districts
 Berwick Area School District (also in Columbia County)
 Crestwood School District
 Dallas School District
 Greater Nanticoke Area School District
 Hanover Area School District
 Hazleton Area School District (also in Carbon and Schuylkill Counties)
 Lake-Lehman School District (also in Wyoming County)
 Northwest Area School District
 Pittston Area School District
 Wilkes-Barre Area School District
 Wyoming Area School District (also in Wyoming County)
 Wyoming Valley West School District

Charter schools
 Bear Creek Community Charter School, Bear Creek Township

Public vocational technical schools
 West Side Career and Technology Center, Pringle

Private schools

 Graham Academy, Kingston
 Holy Cross High School, located in Lackawanna County; it serves Luzerne County residents
 Holy Redeemer High School, Wilkes-Barre
 Jenny Lynn Ferraro Academy, Kingston
 Milford E. Barnes Junior School, Wilkes-Barre
 MMI Preparatory School, Freeland
 New Story School, Wyoming
 Wilkes-Barre Academy, Wilkes-Barre
 Wyoming Seminary, Forty Fort and Kingston

Colleges and universities

 Geisinger Commonwealth School of Medicine, Wilkes-Barre
 King's College, Wilkes-Barre
 Luzerne County Community College, Nanticoke
 McCann School of Business & Technology, Wilkes-Barre
 Misericordia University, Dallas
 Penn State Hazleton, Hazleton
 Penn State Wilkes-Barre, Lehman Township
 Wilkes University, Wilkes-Barre

Libraries
The Luzerne County Library System includes the following locations:

Back Mountain Memorial Library, Back Mountain
Hazleton Area Public Library, Hazleton
Hoyt Library, Kingston
Marian Sutherland Kirby Library, Mountain Top
Mill Memorial Library, Nanticoke
Osterhout Free Library, Wilkes-Barre
Pittston Memorial Library, Pittston
Plymouth Public Library, Plymouth
West Pittston Library, West Pittston
Wyoming Free Library, Wyoming

Culture

Local attractions

 Bear Creek Village Historic District, Bear Creek Village
 Bittenbender Covered Bridge, Huntington Township
 Eckley Miners' Village, Foster Township
 F.M. Kirby Center for the Performing Arts, Wilkes-Barre
 Giants Despair Hillclimb, Laurel Run
 Kingston Armory, Kingston
 Little Theatre of Wilkes-Barre, Wilkes-Barre
 Luzerne County Museum, Wilkes-Barre
 Mohegan Sun Arena at Casey Plaza, Wilkes-Barre Township
 Mohegan Sun at Pocono Downs, Plains Township
 Public Square, Wilkes-Barre
 River Street Historic District, Wilkes-Barre
 Stegmaier Brewery, Wilkes-Barre
 Swetland Homestead, Wyoming
 Wilkes-Barre station, Wilkes-Barre
 Wyoming Monument, Wyoming
 Wyoming Valley Mall, Wilkes-Barre Township

Media
The Scranton/Wilkes-Barre area is the 55th-largest U.S. television market. Local television stations include: WNEP-TV (ABC affiliate), WBRE-TV (NBC affiliate), WYOU-TV (CBS affiliate), WVIA-TV (PBS affiliate), WOLF-TV (FOX affiliate), WQMY (MyNetworkTV affiliate), WSWB (CW affiliate), WQPX (Ion Television affiliate), and WYLN-LP (Youtoo TV affiliate).

Times Leader and The Citizens' Voice are the two largest daily newspapers in the Wilkes-Barre area. Wilkes-Barre's radio market is ranked No. 69 by Arbitron's ranking system. There are news, adult alternative, and music radio stations which are receivable in the area.

Sports

Transportation

Highways

Railroads
 Canadian Pacific Railway (CP)
 Delaware and Hudson Railway (DH)
 Luzerne and Susquehanna Railway (LS)
 Norfolk Southern Railway (NS)
 North Shore Railroad (NSHR)
 Reading Blue Mountain and Northern Railroad (RBMN)

Airports
 Hazleton Municipal Airport
 Wilkes-Barre/Scranton International Airport
 Wilkes-Barre Wyoming Valley Airport

Communities

Luzerne County contains the second highest number of independently governing municipalities in the state of Pennsylvania, with 76; only Allegheny County has more. Under Pennsylvania law, there are four types of incorporated municipalities: cities, boroughs, townships, and, in the case of Bloomsburg, towns. The following cities, boroughs, and townships are located in Luzerne County:

Cities
 Hazleton
 Nanticoke
 Pittston
 Wilkes-Barre (county seat)

Boroughs

 Ashley
 Avoca
 Bear Creek Village
 Conyngham
 Courtdale
 Dallas
 Dupont
 Duryea
 Edwardsville
 Exeter
 Forty Fort
 Freeland
 Harveys Lake
 Hughestown
 Jeddo
 Kingston
 Laflin
 Larksville
 Laurel Run
 Luzerne
 Nescopeck
 New Columbus
 Nuangola
 Penn Lake Park
 Plymouth
 Pringle
 Shickshinny
 Sugar Notch
 Swoyersville
 Warrior Run
 West Hazleton
 West Pittston
 West Wyoming
 White Haven
 Wyoming
 Yatesville

Townships

 Bear Creek
 Black Creek
 Buck
 Butler
 Conyngham
 Dallas
 Dennison
 Dorrance
 Exeter
 Fairmount
 Fairview
 Foster
 Franklin
 Hanover
 Hazle
 Hollenback
 Hunlock
 Huntington
 Jackson
 Jenkins
 Kingston
 Lake
 Lehman
 Nescopeck
 Newport
 Pittston
 Plains
 Plymouth
 Rice
 Ross
 Salem
 Slocum
 Sugarloaf
 Union
 Wilkes-Barre
 Wright

Census-designated places
Census-designated places are geographical areas designated by the U.S. Census Bureau for the purposes of compiling demographic data. They are not actual jurisdictions under Pennsylvania law.

 Beech Mountain Lakes
 Browntown
 Chase
 East Berwick
 Georgetown
 Glen Lyon
 Harleigh
 Hickory Hills
 Hilldale
 Hudson
 Huntington Mills
 Inkerman
 Lattimer
 Mocanaqua
 Mountain Top
 Nuremberg
 Pardeesville
 Pikes Creek
 Plains
 Shavertown
 Sheatown
 Silkworth
 Trucksville
 Upper Exeter
 Wanamie
 West Nanticoke
 Weston

Other places

 Alden
 Back Mountain
 Beach Haven
 Breslau
 Cambra
 Cranberry
 Drifton
 Drums
 Ebervale
 Glen Summit Springs
 Greater Pittston
 Harveyville
 Humboldt
 Hunlock Creek
 Japan
 Kis-Lyn
 Koonsville
 Korn Krest
 Kunkle
 Lehman
 Milnesville
 Moosehead
 Mossville
 Mountain Grove
 Old Boston
 Port Griffith
 Rock Glen
 Saint Johns
 Sandy Run
 Suscon
 Sweet Valley
 Sybertsville
 Tomhicken
 Wapwallopen
 Waterton
 Zenith

Population ranking
The population ranking of the following table is based on the 2010 census of Luzerne County.

† county seat

Notable people

See also
 Luzerne County Transportation Authority
 National Register of Historic Places listings in Luzerne County, Pennsylvania
 Pennamite–Yankee War

Notes

References

External links

 Official Luzerne County website
 
 Tournepa.com: Luzerne County Convention and Visitors Bureau
 The Luzerne Foundation — the county's Community Foundation.
 Luzerne County Community College website

 
1786 establishments in Pennsylvania
Anthracite Coal Region of Pennsylvania
Counties of Appalachia
Polish-American culture in Pennsylvania
Populated places established in 1786